Statistics Finland is the national statistical institution in Finland, established in 1865 to serve as an information service and to provide statistics and expertise in the statistical sciences. The institution employs more than 800 experts from varying fields.

The institution is led by Director General Markus Sovala.

References

External links

1865 establishments in Finland
Finland
Demographics of Finland
Government of Finland